The Canton of Châteauneuf-sur-Sarthe is a former French canton located in the Maine-et-Loire département of France, in the arrondissement of Segré. It had 13,267 inhabitants (2012). It was disbanded following the French canton reorganisation which came into effect in March 2015. It consisted of 15 communes, which joined the canton of Tiercé in 2015.

The canton comprised the following communes:

 Châteauneuf-sur-Sarthe
 Brissarthe
 Champigné
 Champteussé-sur-Baconne
 Chemiré-sur-Sarthe
 Chenillé-Changé
 Cherré
 Contigné
 Juvardeil
 Marigné
 Miré
 Querré
 Sceaux-d'Anjou
 Sœurdres
 Thorigné-d'Anjou

See also 
 Cantons of the Maine-et-Loire department
 Communes of the Maine-et-Loire department

References

External links
 canton of Châteauneuf-sur-Sarthe on the web of the General Council of Maine-et-Loire

Former cantons of Maine-et-Loire
2015 disestablishments in France
States and territories disestablished in 2015